Ethmia kabulica is a moth in the family Depressariidae. It was described by Hans Georg Amsel in 1969. It is found in Afghanistan.

References

Moths described in 1969
kabulica